Lower Milford Township is a township in Lehigh County, Pennsylvania. The population of Lower Milford Township was 3,775 at the 2010 census. It is a suburb of Allentown in the Lehigh Valley region of eastern Pennsylvania.

History
The Dillingersville Union School and Church was added to the National Register of Historic Places in 1978.

Geography
Lower Milford is the southernmost township in Lehigh County. Its villages include Corning (also in Upper Milford Township), Dillingersville, Hosensack, Kraussdale, Limeport (also in Upper Saucon Township) and Zionsville. 
It is located in the Delaware watershed. Saucon Creek begins in Lower Milford and drains part of it north into the Lehigh River. Lower Milford is also the source of three tributary creeks of Perkiomen Creek, which drains south to the Schuylkill River: Hosensack Creek (which starts near the source of the Saucon), Unami Creek, and Macoby Creek. The majority of the township is hilly and is located in the South Mountains and on Mill Hill to the south and east of the Hosensack Valley.

Lower Milford Township has a hot-summer humid continental climate (Dfa) and is in hardiness zone 6b.

Adjacent municipalities
Upper Milford Township (northwest)
Upper Saucon Township (northeast)
Springfield Township (tangent to the east)
Milford Township (southeast)
Upper Hanover Township (southwest)
Hereford Township (tangent to the west)

Transportation

Interstate 476 follows the Pennsylvania Turnpike's Northeast Extension through the northern and eastern parts of Lower Milford Township on a southeast-northwest alignment. However, the nearest interchange is in neighboring Milford Township in Bucks County. No other numbered highways serve the township. Main thoroughfares include Church View Road, Kings Highway, Limeport Pike, Palm Road, Spinnerstown Road, Steinburg Road and Zionsville Road.

Demographics

As of the census of 2000, there were 3,617 people, 1,277 households, and 1,039 families residing in the township.  The population density was 184.1 people per square mile (71.1/km2).  There were 1,308 housing units at an average density of 66.6/sq mi (25.7/km2).  The racial makeup of the township was 98.09% White, 0.17% African American, 0.25% Native American, 0.55% Asian, 0.11% from other races, and 0.83% from two or more races. Hispanic or Latino of any race were 0.69% of the population.

There were 1,277 households, out of which 35.5% had children under the age of 18 living with them, 71.6% were married couples living together, 6.0% had a female householder with no husband present, and 18.6% were non-families. 13.2% of all households were made up of individuals, and 4.7% had someone living alone who was 65 years of age or older.  The average household size was 2.83 and the average family size was 3.12.

In the township, the population was spread out, with 25.1% under the age of 18, 5.9% from 18 to 24, 29.2% from 25 to 44, 28.4% from 45 to 64, and 11.5% who were 65 years of age or older.  The median age was 40 years. For every 100 females there were 102.2 males.  For every 100 females age 18 and over, there were 101.2 males. The median income for a household in the township was $67,008, and the median income for a family was $75,409. Males had a median income of $42,149 versus $26,000 for females. The per capita income for the township was $27,572.  About 2.1% of families and 2.8% of the population were below the poverty line, including 1.3% of those under age 18 and 7.8% of those age 65 or over.

Public education
Along with the borough of Coopersburg and Upper Saucon Township, Lower Milford is served by the Southern Lehigh School District. The district's schools include Lower Milford Elementary School for grades K–3, Southern Lehigh Intermediate School for grades 4–6, Southern Lehigh Middle School for grades 7–8, and Southern Lehigh High School in Center Valley for grades 9–12.

References

External links

Townships in Lehigh County, Pennsylvania
Townships in Pennsylvania